Lennart Hjalmar Hjulström (18 July 1938 – 3 July 2022) was a Swedish actor and director. He was married to Gunilla Nyroos and father of Niklas and Carin Hjulström. His father was Filip Hjulström.

Partial filmography

1983: Berget på månens baksida (director)
1985: August Strindberg: ett liv (TV Mini-Series) – Teaterdirektör Hedberg
1986: My Life as a Dog – Konstnären
1986: Moa – Karl
1986: I lagens namn – Chief of Police
1987: Nionde kompaniet – Nils Jönsson
1989: Codename Coq Rouge – Näslund
1989–1991: Tre kärlekar (TV Series) – Wing commander Erik Söderberg
1990: Blackjack – Inger's Father
1991: The Ox – Svenning Gustavsson
1992: The Best Intentions – Disponent Nordenson
1994: Sommarmord – Aahlen, prosecutor
1996: Rusar i hans famn (director) – Civil Servant
1997: Et hjørne af paradis – Carl von Ekelöw
1997: Beck (TV Series) – Gavling
1999: Zero Tolerance – Jourkommissarie Ola Sellberg
2001: Executive Protection – Sellberg
2002: Outside Your Door – Gustav, André's Father
2003: Evil – Headmaster Lindblad
2003: The Third Wave – Sellberg
2005: Medicinmannen (TV Mini-Series) – Alex Holst
2007: Predikanten (TV Movie) – Gabriel Hult
2008: Oskyldigt dömd
2009: The Girl Who Kicked the Hornets' Nest – Fredrik Clinton
2012: Hamilton: In the Interest of the Nation – DG
2012: Agent Hamilton: But Not If It Concerns Your Daughter – DG
2012: The Last Sentence – Marcus Wallenberg
2016: Tjuvjägaren – Prästen
2017: The Poacher – The Vicar

References

External links

1938 births
2022 deaths
Swedish film directors
Swedish male actors
Eugene O'Neill Award winners
Litteris et Artibus recipients
People from Karlstad